Marco Antonio Prieto (born 7 November 1985) is a Paraguayan footballer, who plays as a forward.

References

External links
 
 

1985 births
Living people
Paraguayan footballers
Paraguayan expatriate footballers
Cerro Porteño (Presidente Franco) footballers
Sportivo Carapeguá footballers
Club Nacional footballers
General Díaz footballers
Central Córdoba de Santiago del Estero footballers
Club Atlético Mitre footballers
Magallanes footballers
Unión Magdalena footballers
Ñublense footballers
Chaco For Ever footballers
River Plate (Asunción) footballers
Primera B de Chile players
Association football midfielders
Paraguayan expatriate sportspeople in Chile
Paraguayan expatriate sportspeople in Argentina
Paraguayan expatriate sportspeople in Colombia
Expatriate footballers in Chile
Expatriate footballers in Argentina
Expatriate footballers in Colombia